Tatipudi may refer to places in India:

 Tatipudi, Vizianagaram, a village in Andhra Pradesh
 Tatipudi Dam, a dam in Andhra Pradesh
 Tatipudi, Khammam, a village in Andhra Pradesh